HMS Glory was a 98-gun second-rate ship of the line of the Royal Navy, launched on 5 July 1788 at Plymouth.

History
In 1798, some of her crew were court-martialed for mutiny.

Glory served as the flagship of Rear-Admiral Sir Charles Stirling at the Battle of Cape Finisterre in 1805, commanded by Captain Samuel Warren.

Glory was re-rated as a prison ship at Chatham on 27 September 1809. Lieutenant Richard Simmonds commanded her in 1810 and 1811. His replacement was Lieutenant Robert Tyte and Vice Admiral George Murray in 1794.

Fate
Glory was paid off into ordinary in August 1814. In 1815 the navy used her as a powder hulk. She was ordered to be broken up in 1819; break up was completed at Chatham on 30 July 1825.

Notes, citations, and references
Notes

Citations

References

 Lavery, Brian (2003) The Ship of the Line - Volume 1: The development of the battlefleet 1650-1850. Conway Maritime Press. .

External links
 

Ships of the line of the Royal Navy
Duke-class ships of the line
1788 ships